Dzmitry Hintaw (born 14 September 1984) is a Belarusian former professional footballer.

Honours
Naftan Novopolotsk
Belarusian Cup winner: 2008–09

Career
Born in Grodno, Hintaw began playing football in Neman Grodno's youth system. He joined the senior team and made his Belarusian Premier League debut in 2002. He would later play in the Premier League with Darida Minsk Raion, Granit Mikashevichi, Naftan Novopolotsk and Torpedo Zhodino.

References

External links

1984 births
Living people
Belarusian footballers
Association football defenders
FC Neman Grodno players
FC Darida Minsk Raion players
FC Granit Mikashevichi players
FC Naftan Novopolotsk players
FC Torpedo-BelAZ Zhodino players
FC Rechitsa-2014 players
FC Gorodeya players
FC Smorgon players